Edward Ambrose "Jiggs" Donahue (February 5, 1891 – October 29, 1961) was an American football and baseball player, coach of multiple sports, and college athletics administrator. He served as the head football coach at Clemson University from 1917 to 1920, compiling a record of 21–12–3 (.625). He also served as the school's basketball and baseball coach, as well as the track coach. Donahue joined the football coaching staff at Western Reserve University in 1931, serving as the backfield coach under head coach Tom Keady.

Donahue attended Somerville High School in Somerville, Massachusetts and Mercersburg Academy in Mercersburg, Pennsylvania. At Washington and Lee University in Lexington, Virginia he starred in baseball as a catcher. Donahue died on October 29, 1961, in Boston, Massachusetts, at the age of 70.

Head coaching record

College football

Notes

References

External links
 
 

1891 births
1961 deaths
American football quarterbacks
Baseball catchers
Case Western Spartans football coaches
Clemson Tigers athletic directors
Clemson Tigers baseball coaches
Clemson Tigers football coaches
Clemson Tigers men's basketball coaches
Clemson Tigers track and field coaches
Dover Senators players
Minor league baseball managers
Washington and Lee Generals baseball players
Washington and Lee Generals football coaches
Washington and Lee Generals football players
Washington and Lee Generals men's basketball coaches
Washington and Lee Generals men's basketball players
Mercersburg Academy alumni
Sportspeople from Somerville, Massachusetts
Coaches of American football from Massachusetts
Players of American football from Massachusetts
Baseball coaches from Massachusetts
Baseball players from Massachusetts
Basketball coaches from Massachusetts
Basketball players from Massachusetts